Yasak Aşk is a 1961 Turkish romantic drama film, directed by Halit Refiğ and starring Nilüfer Aydan, Efgan Efekan, and Cahit Irgat.

References

External links
Yasak Aşk at the Internet Movie Database

1961 films
Turkish romantic drama films
1961 romantic drama films
Films directed by Halit Refiğ
Turkish black-and-white films